Splendrillia persica is a species of sea snail, a marine gastropod mollusk in the family Drilliidae.

Description
The length of the fusiform shell attains 9 mm, its diameter 3 mm.

Distribution
This marine species occurs in the Persian Gulf.

References

 Wells F.E. (1993) New records of Splendrillia (Gastropoda: Turridae) from northwestern Australia, with the description of a new species. Journal of the Malacological Society of Australia 14: 113–117

External links
 Smith, E.A. (1888) Diagnoses of new species of Pleurotomidae in the British Museum. Annals and Magazine of Natural History, series 6, 2, 300–317
  Tucker, J.K. 2004 Catalog of recent and fossil turrids (Mollusca: Gastropoda). Zootaxa 682:1–1295.
 

persica
Gastropods described in 1888